The 1968 Coupe de France Final was a football match held at Stade Olympique Yves-du-Manoir, Colombes on May 12, 1968, that saw AS Saint-Étienne defeat FC Girondins de Bordeaux 2–1 thanks to goals by Rachid Mekloufi.

Match details

See also
Coupe de France 1967-68

External links
Coupe de France results at Rec.Sport.Soccer Statistics Foundation
Report on French federation site

Coupe De France Final
1968
Coupe De France Final 1968
Coupe De France Final 1968
Coupe de France Final
Sport in Hauts-de-Seine
Coupe de France Final